The 1925 Michigan State Normal Normalites football team was an American football team that represented Michigan State Normal School (later renamed Eastern Michigan University) during the 1925 college football season. The Normalites compiled a perfect 8–0 record, shut out seven of eight opponents, won the Michigan Intercollegiate Athletic Association championship, and outscored all opponents by a combined total of 106 to 6.

In February 1925, Elton Rynearson was appointed as Michigan State Normal's director of sports.  He previously played and coached football at the school, but left in 1920 to pursue advanced studies at the University of Michigan. He also served as Michigan State Normal's head football coach from 1925 to 1948. In the six years after Rynearson's return as head coach (1925-1930), the football team compiled a 40-4-2 record.

Schedule

References

Michigan State Normal
Eastern Michigan Eagles football seasons
College football undefeated seasons
Michigan State Normal Normalites football